The Virginia Cavaliers men's soccer team represent the University of Virginia in all NCAA Division I men's soccer competitions. The Virginia Cavaliers are a member of the Atlantic Coast Conference.

Virginia has an extensive reputation as one of the most elite collegiate soccer programs of the United States. The program has produced several prominent United States national team players such as Claudio Reyna, John Harkes, Jeff Agoos, Ben Olsen, and Tony Meola. Future U.S. national team coach Bruce Arena coached Virginia to five College Cup titles in a six-year period during the 1980s and 1990s, and his protégé George Gelnovatch has since guided the Cavaliers to six College Cups and four championship games, winning two of them.

The Cavaliers made the College Cup tournament bracket for a record 39 consecutive years, which ended in 2020, the most of any team in the history of the sport. The program has won seven NCAA Championships (1989, 1991, 1992, 1993, 1994, 2009, 2014) and have the most national titles of any program since 1990. Virginia ranks third overall in the sport's championship history since 1959.

History 
The University of Virginia first fielded a varsity men's soccer team in 1941 as a member of the Intercollegiate Soccer Football Association. In their first season, the team posted a winless record, losing all nine of their matches. The Atlantic Coast Conference added soccer in 1955, followed by the first NCAA Men's Division I Soccer Championship in 1959. The team made their first appearance in the NCAA tournament in 1969.

Bruce Arena became Virginia's soccer and assistant lacrosse coach in 1978, moving exclusively to soccer in 1985. The Cavaliers' first tournament victory, over William and Mary in 1983 (a team featuring future comedian Jon Stewart), sparked a run to their first College Cup appearance.

The Cavaliers have qualified for the NCAA tournament every year since 1981; those 39 appearances are a record for men's soccer and one of the longest streaks in any NCAA sport. Their apex came in the late 1980s to early 1990s under Arena, when the team won five national collegiate championships in the span of six years. Future U.S. men's national team stars such as John Harkes and Claudio Reyna were members of these championship teams.

Virginia's first championship, in 1989, came in one of the most famous games in the history of college soccer. Played at Rutgers University on December 3 against Santa Clara, the wind chill was ten degrees below zero at kickoff and fell further during the game. Virginia led the defensive slugfest 1–0 before a rare mistake from Curt Onalfo in the 84th minute allowed Santa Clara to send the game to overtime. As NCAA rules had recently changed to limit games to one 30-minute overtime followed by a 30-minute sudden-death period – after the 1985 final required eight 10-minute extra periods – and did not allow penalty kicks in the final, Virginia and Santa Clara were declared co-champions when the game remained tied 1–1 after 150 minutes.

The Cavaliers went on to win the 1991, 1992, 1993, and 1994 editions of the tournament, and as the first overall seed were upset in the semifinals in 1995. The four consecutive championships remains an NCAA record; no other team managed even three in a row until Stanford did so in 2017.

Arena departed for the new men's professional league Major League Soccer in 1996, where he led D.C. United to three MLS Cup titles, two Supporters' Shields and a CONCACAF Champions League title. He was replaced by longtime assistant George Gelnovatch, who remains the coach today. Gelnovatch returned the team to the 1997 final, where they lost 2–0 to UCLA.

After a string of early-round exits in the late 1990s and early 2000s, the team returned to the College Cup in 2006 and the national championship game in 2009. Playing against the upstart Akron Zips that year, the Cavaliers were able to prevail in a penalty kick shootout to claim their sixth NCAA title, and their first national championship since the Arena years. Virginia added a seventh NCAA championship by defeating UCLA in a shootout in the 2014 tournament.

Roster

Current roster

Stadium 

One of the earliest soccer-specific stadiums in college soccer, the Virginia Cavaliers men's soccer team plays their home matches at the 8,000-seater Klöckner Stadium. Since its opening in 1997, the Cavaliers have enjoyed some of the highest reported attendance figures in American college soccer.

The stadium has 3,600 grandstand seats along with an additional 3,400 grass seats. It is shared with the women's soccer team, as well as the men's and women's lacrosse teams.

Rivalries

Maryland 

Both UVA and Maryland have NCAA Championship programs in men's soccer. The Virginia Cavaliers have won seven NCAA Championships to Maryland's four. When they were both in the Atlantic Coast Conference, some cited the rivalry between the Cavaliers and the Maryland Terrapins as one of the most bitter rivalries in college soccer. In 2011, FirstPoint USA rated the rivalry as the third best rivalry in college soccer.

The Terrapins' departure to the Big Ten has put the annual rivalry on hiatus. Maryland recorded a 1–0 victory in the 2015 NCAA tournament and No. 12 Virginia dethroned No. 1 Maryland, 2–0, in a regular season game on September 2, 2019, helping Virginia to take over the No. 1 ranking weeks later.

Virginia Tech 

As intra-conference members, and having a longstanding rivalry, another one of the top rivals of the Virginia Cavaliers is the Virginia Tech Hokies. The series between the two has been heavily dominated by the Cavaliers, who boast a 31–2–5 record and 14-match unbeaten streak against the Hokies.

Team management

Coaching staff
Updated January 25, 2023

Head coaching history

Seasons 
Source: [1]

Source:

Honors 

 ACC Men's Soccer Tournament
 Winners (11): 1988, 1991, 1992, 1993, 1994, 1995, 1997, 2003, 2004, 2009, 2019
 Runners-up (8): 1990, 1996, 1999, 2000, 2001, 2002, 2008, 2017
 ACC Regular Season
 First Place (19): 1969, 1970, 1979, 1984, 1986, 1987, 1988, 1989, 1990, 1991, 1992, 1995, 1996, 1998, 2000, 2001, 2005, 2010, 2019
 Runners-up (8): 1956, 1957, 1963, 1994, 1997, 1998, 2005, 2016
 College Cup
 Winners (7): 1989, 1991, 1992, 1993, 1994, 2009, 2014
 Runners-up (2): 1997, 2019
 Commonwealth Clash
 Winners (31): 1975, 1977, 1978, 1979, 1980, 1981, 1982, 1983, 1984, 1985, 1986, 1989, 1990, 1991, 1992, 1993, 1994, 1995, 1996, 1997, 1998, 1999, 2006, 2008, 2009, 2010, 2012, 2014, 2015, 2017, 2019
 Runners-up (2): 2004, 2005
 Virginia Intercollegiate Soccer Association Tournament
 Winners (9): 1961, 1962, 1963, 1970, 1977, 1981, 1982, 1984
 Runners-up (3): 1964, 1967, 1971

Notable alumni

Brad Agoos, head coach of Black Rock FC
Jeff Agoos *, Swiss-born American soccer defender
Pablo Aguilar *
Chris Albright *
Kenny Arena, assistant coach at FC Cincinnati
Shawn Barry *
Joe Bell *, New Zealand international currently with Brøndby IF
Eric Bird, currently with FC Tulsa
Jeff Caldwell, currently with Colorado Springs Switchbacks
Matt Chulis, associate head coach of Virginia Cavaliers men's soccer
Daryl Dike * currently with West Brom
Irakoze Donasiyano * currently with Nashville SC
Alecko Eskandarian *
Derrick Etienne * currently with Atlanta United
Victor Falck currently with Central Valley Fuego
Hunter Freeman, currently the FC Cincinnati Director of Scouting
George Gelnovatch, head coach of Virginia Cavaliers men's soccer 
Oliver Gerbig, currently with Kitchee
Bret Halsey, currently with FC Cincinnati 2
John Harkes *, head coach of Greenville Triumph
Jackson Hopkins, currently with D.C. United
Erik Imler *
Justin Ingram, currently with Las Vegas Lights
Hunter Jumper, currently with Georgia Storm FC
Aboubacar Keita, currently with Colorado Rapids
Kris Kelderman, head coach of University of Milwaukee
Henry Kessler *, currently with New England Revolution
Jean-Christophe Koffi, currently with Loudoun United
Kyle Martino *, soccer analyst for NBC Sports
Tony Meola *
Sergi Nus, currently with South Georgia Tormenta FC
Ben Olsen *, head coach of Houston Dynamo
Curt Onalfo *
Brian Ownby, currently with Louisville City FC
Peter Pearson *
Clint Peay, head coach of New England Revolution II
Alex Rando, currently with New York City FC II
Claudio Reyna *, currently Austin FC Sporting Director
Jake Rozhansky, currently with New England Revolution II
Colin Shutler, currently with Orange County SC
Mike Slivinski *
Bakary Soumaré *
Brian Span, currently with Haninge
Tony Tchani *, currently with the Maryland Bobcats
Brian West *
Richie Williams, assistant coach of New England Revolution

* – Player has represented their country at the senior national team level

Notes

References 
General
 NCAA results and statistics sourced to: 
 ACC tournament results and statistics sourced to: 
Citations

External links

 

 
1941 establishments in Virginia
Association football clubs established in 1941